Remona Fransen (born November 11, 1985) is a Dutch athlete, specialising in multi-eventing disciplines.

At the 2011 European Indoor Championships in Athletics in Paris, Fransen won her first major international medal in the pentathlon with a points total of 4,665. En route to her pentathlon bronze, she broke the Dutch indoor record in the high jump with a height of 1.92 m.

Major competitive record

References

External links
 Official website (translated)
IAAF profile
 Athletics Union athlete bio: Remona Fransen (translated)

1985 births
Living people
Dutch heptathletes
Sportspeople from Dordrecht